The 2015 Central Michigan Chippewas football team represented Central Michigan University in the 2015 NCAA Division I FBS football season. They were led by first-year head coach John Bonamego and played their home games at Kelly/Shorts Stadium. They were members of the West Division of the Mid-American Conference. They finished the season 7–6, 6–2 in MAC play to finish in a four-way tie for the West Division title. However, due to losses to Western Michigan and Toledo, two other teams to finish 6–2 in the West Division, they did not represent the West Division in the MAC Championship Game. They were invited to the Quick Lane Bowl where they were defeated by Minnesota.

Schedule

Game summaries

Oklahoma State

Monmouth

at Syracuse

at Michigan State

Northern Illinois

at Western Michigan

Buffalo

at Ball State

at Akron

Toledo

at Kent State

Eastern Michigan

Minnesota–Quick Lane Bowl

References

Central Michigan
Central Michigan Chippewas football seasons
Central Michigan Chippewas football